Panangad Grama panchayat is one among the 75 grama panchayat in Kozhikode district. It is near Balussery and coming under Balussery block.

Administration
Even though this is a backward panchayat its developmental activities are well known. It won the best panchayat trophy in 2001 and once secured the best panchayat within the district. Apart from these it received Nirmal puraskar for its cleanliness nature. Mrs. V.M.Kamalakshi is the prevailing president of the panchayat. Panchayat is having 20 wards now.

Transportation
Panangad village connects to other parts of India through Koyilandy town. The nearest airports are at Kannur and Kozhikode. The nearest railway station is at Koyiandy. The national highway no.66 passes through Koyilandy and the northern stretch connects to Mangalore, Goa and Mumbai. The southern stretch connects to Cochin and Trivandrum. The eastern National Highway No.54 going through Kuttiady connects to Mananthavady, Mysore and Bangalore.

Industrial Growth

Kinaloor Estate (Cochin Malabar Estates)

Kinaloor Estate (Cochin Malabar Estates) is a valley with a mountain on one side and a rubber plantation on the other. There is a plain in the middle of the plantation and the mountain which is a proposed site for the KSIDC (SEZ) industrial area.

Sports 
The Usha sports school is located at Kinaloor estate in Panangad Grama Panchayath, Vattoli Bazaar. The school is located here at Kinaloor estate, Vattoli Bazaar around 5 km from Balussery.

Vayalada Hill Station

Vayalada, a picturesque hilltop destination in Panangad panchayat favoured by weekend trekkers, will soon get better amenities to help visitors enjoy its scenic charms. The government has, under the Balussery Tourism Corridor Project, sanctioned ₹3.4 crore for setting up basic tourism amenities at Mullanpara viewpoint and surrounding areas in Vayalada.

The destination, located nearly 40 km away from the city overlooking the Peruvannamoozhi reservoir, will get a few rain shelters, better parking facility, cafeteria and comfort stations. Hand-railings too will be fixed around the viewpoint, taking into consideration the safety of visitors. This is a popularise the destination Balussery - Kannadipoyil - kurumboyil Route.

External links
 www.panangadgp.org

Koyilandy area